Ponniah Manicavasagam was a Ceylon Tamil politician and Member of Parliament.

Manicavasagam was born on 11 December 1912.

Manicavasagam stood as the Illankai Tamil Arasu Kachchi's (Federal Party) candidate for Kalkudah at the 1956 parliamentary election but was defeated by A. H. Macan Markar. He stood again at the March 1960 parliamentary election. This time he won the election and entered Parliament. He was re-elected at the July 1960 parliamentary election. He stood for re-election at the 1965 parliamentary election but was defeated by the United National Party candidate K. W. Devanayagam. He was defeated by Devanayagam at the 1970 parliamentary election as well.

References

1912 births
Illankai Tamil Arasu Kachchi politicians
Members of the 4th Parliament of Ceylon
Members of the 5th Parliament of Ceylon
People from Eastern Province, Sri Lanka
People from British Ceylon
Sri Lankan Tamil politicians
Year of death missing